Abdullah Beg Benari was a Kurdish tribal leader, who lived from 1880 to 1939. He was the son of Sheikh Jahangir, who was the son of Sultan Beg, and a descendant of Bradostian Kurdish princes who fought in the battle of Dimdim Castle against the Iranian invasion by the Shah Abbas in 1609. Abdullah lived in the castle of Binar, which witnessed several battles between the local princes of Bradost and the Iranian-Afshar army. The last battle was fought between Mir Sultan Bradost and Amir Askar Afshar Urmia in 1841. Kurdish folklore is full of oral stories about Aola Begi Benare and his battles against the Persians and Russians.

Abdullah settled in Shaitanawa south of Urmia. The Shah of Qajar captured him, took him to Zanjan, and sentenced him to death for his support of Simko Shikak's revolution in Urmia, but Abdullah was freed after the  efforts exerted by the relatives of his Afsharian wife. He formed a Kurdish cavalry against Russian troops when they invade Rawanduz, Iraqi Kurdistan in 1916. He witnessed the unrest of Urmiah between Kurds and Assyrians when Mar Shimun XIX Benyamin, Catholicos-Patriarch of the Assyrian Church of the East, was assassinated by Simko Shikak, the Kurdish tribe leader, in March 1918. Abdullah Beg died in 1939 in the town of Sidakan, in the Bradost area, north of Rawanduz.

1880 births
1939 deaths
Iranian Kurdish people
People from Urmia